José Gomes Filho (August 31, 1919 – July 10, 1982), more commonly known as Jackson do Pandeiro, was a Brazilian percussionist and singer. He is described by Allmusic as a key promotor of Northeastern Brazilian music (along with Luiz Gonzaga) and one of the most inventive and influential Brazilian musicians, though much of his recognition was posthumous.

Biography

Jackson was born in Paraíba, Brazil, a region in the northeast of the country. His mother, Flora Mourão, was a musician and singer who played several percussion instruments. As a child he had originally wanted to play the accordion, but his parents could not afford it and bought him a pandeiro, a type of tambourine, in its place. He began playing music with the zabumba, however, to assist his mother in performances. When Jackson was 13 years old his family moved to Campina Grande, a city in Paraíba. After the move, Jackson lived in João Pessoa, where he performed in various cabarets and on the radio; and also to Recife, where he eventually began working in a radio station and took the pseudonym of Jackson do Pandeiro. Originally his mother had nicknamed him "Jack", after the actor Jack Perry, who played parts in cowboy films which were popular in Brazil during Jackson's youth. He had his first hit with "Sebastiana", a song based on traditional Brazilian rhythms.

The single was followed by a number of albums that were successful with audiences throughout Brazil. Soon after, he joined his future wife Almira Castilhos de Albuquerque on a trip to Rio de Janeiro, financed by his recent success. The two had been performing in a duo together and were eventually married in October 1954. However, the duo and marriage were jointly ended in 1967, and Jackson's popularity diminished soon after. Jackson did find some greater success later, though, when the popular singer and guitarist Gilberto Gil, as well as the singer Gal Costa, rerecorded some of his material in 1972.

Discography
1954: Sua Majestade – o Rei do Ritmo
1955: Jackson do Pandeiro
1956: Forró do Jackson
1957: Jackson e Almira – Os Donos do Ritmo
1958: Forró do Jackson
1959: Jackson do Pandeiro
1960: Cantando de Norte a Sul
1961: Ritmo, Melodia e a Personalidade de Jackson do Pandeiro
1961: Mais Ritmo
1962: A Alegria da Casa
1962: ...É Batucada!
1963: Forró do Zé Lagoa
1964: Tem Jabaculê
1964: Coisas Nossas
1965: ...E Vamos Nós!
1966: O Cabra da Peste
1967: A Braza do Norte
1970: Aqui Tô Eu
1971: O Dono do Forró
1972: Sina de Cigarra
1973: Tem Mulher, Tô Lá
1974: Nossas Raízes
1975: A Tuba da Muié
1976: É Sucesso
1977: Um Nordestino Alegre
1978: Alegria Minha Gente
1980: São João Autêntico de Jackson do Pandeiro
1981: Isso é que é Forró!

References

1919 births
1982 deaths
20th-century Brazilian male singers
20th-century Brazilian singers